Umar Nurmagomedov (born January 3, 1996), is a Russian mixed martial artist currently competing in the Bantamweight division of the Ultimate Fighting Championship (UFC). He has previously competed in the Eagle Fighting Championship (EFC) and Professional Fighters League (PFL). He is the older brother of Bellator champion Usman Nurmagomedov and a cousin of former UFC Lightweight Champion Khabib Nurmagomedov. As of December 6, 2022, he is #11 in the UFC bantamweight rankings.

Background 
Nurmagomedov was born in Kizilyurt, Dagestan, Russia on January 3, 1996.

As a child, living in his native village, with his brother Usman Nurmagomedov, he began to attend freestyle wrestling practice. Later, Umar began practicing Thai boxing, and his brother followed suit.

After moving to Makhachkala, Umar began training with his uncle, Honored Coach of Russia Abdulmanap Nurmagomedov at the Eagles MMA camp. He is of Avar ethnic origin.

At the age of 19, Umar became World Champion in Combat Sambo under WCSF organization. Next year as 20 years old, he went on to become WMMAA's World Champion in Amateur MMA.

Mixed martial arts career

Early career 
He made his debut in Moscow as part of the Fight Nights Global 57 on December 16, 2016 against Rishat Kharisov. Umar won via second round guillotine choke. In his sophomore performance, Umar fought Ulukbek Amanbaev at Fight Star: Battle on Sura 6 on January 5, 2017, winning inside the first round by the way of rear-naked choke. Returning to Fight Nights Global for his next 4 bouts; Umar defeated Alym Isabaev at Fight Nights Global 62 by TKO stoppage in the second round, Valisher Rakhmonov by second round rear-naked choke at Fight Nights Global 71, Nauruz Dzamikhov by unanimous decision at Fight Nights Global 76 and finally Shyudi Yamauchi by unanimous decision at Fight Nights Global 83. Moving over to Samara MMA Federation (now known as Eagle FC), on May 11, 2018 Umar won the FMMAS Bantamweight Championship against Fatkhidin Sobirov at Samara at the Battle on Volga 4, winning the title and the bout by unanimous decision.

On August 30, 2018, Nurmagomedov fought at PFL 7 against future UFC fighter Saidyokub Kakhramonov, winning the bout by unanimous decision.

Returning to Samara MMA Federation, Umar defended his title at Battle on the Volga 10 on April 14, 2019, where he defeated Brazilian Wagner Lima by unanimous decision. With his title once again on the line (with Samara MMA Federation changing its name to Gorilla Fighting Championship), Umar defeated Taras Gryckiv at GFC 14 on July 13, 2019 by rear-naked choke in the first round.

Umar made his return to PFL, competing at PFL 6 on August 8, 2019, where Umar defeated Sidemar Honorio by unanimous decision.

On November 23, 2019, in the capital of Uzbekistan, Tashkent, Umar defended his title against Argentine fighter Brian Gonzalez, defeating his opponent via rear-naked choke at the end of the first round.

Ultimate Fighting Championship 
Nurmagomedov was scheduled to face Hunter Azure on April 18, 2020 at UFC 249. However, the event was then postponed.

Nurmagomedov was scheduled to face Nathaniel Wood on 26 July 2020 at UFC on ESPN 14. However, Nurmagomedov withdrew from the bout due to his uncle Abdulmanap Nurmagomedov's passing.

Nurmagomedov was initially scheduled to face Sergey Morozov on October 24, 2020 at UFC 254, but Nurmagomedov pulled out due to an illness. The pairing was then rescheduled for UFC 257 on January 24, 2021. However, the bout was yet again rescheduled the second time on January 20, 2021 at UFC on ESPN: Chiesa vs. Magny. Umar won the bout via a rear-naked choke in the second round. This bout earned him the Performance of the Night bonus.

Nurmagomedov faced Brian Kelleher on March 5, 2022 at UFC 272. He won the fight via a rear naked choke in round one.

Nurmagomedov was scheduled to face Jack Shore on March 19, 2022, at UFC Fight Night: Volkov vs. Aspinall. However, Nurmagomedov was removed from the bout for unknown reason and he was replaced by Timur Valiev.

Nurmagomedov faced Nate Maness on June 25, 2022, at UFC Fight Night: Tsarukyan vs. Gamrot. He won via unanimous decision.

Nurmagomedov faced Raoni Barcelos on January 14, 2023, at UFC Fight Night: Strickland vs. Imavov. He won the fight via knockout in the first round. This win earned him the Performance of the Night bonus.

Championships and accomplishments
Ultimate Fighting Championship
 Performance of the Night (Two times) 
Eagle Fighting Championship (Then Federation of MMA of Samara)
GF Bantamweight Championship (One time) 
Three successful title defences
Combat Sambo Championship (WCSF)
 Sambo Champion 
World Mixed Martial Arts Association (WMMAA)
  World Championship

Mixed martial arts record 

|-
|Win
|align=center|16–0
|Raoni Barcelos
|KO (body kick and punch)
|UFC Fight Night: Strickland vs. Imavov
|
|align=center|1
|align=center|4:40
|Las Vegas, Nevada, United States
|
|-
|Win
|align=center|15–0
|Nate Maness
|Decision (unanimous)
|UFC on ESPN: Tsarukyan vs. Gamrot
|
|align=center| 3
|align=center| 5:00
|Las Vegas, Nevada, United States
|
|-
|Win
|align=center|14–0
|Brian Kelleher
|Submission (rear-naked choke)
|UFC 272
|
|align=center|1
|align=center|3:15
|Las Vegas, Nevada, United States
|
|-
|Win
|align=center|13–0
|Sergey Morozov
|Technical Submission (rear-naked choke)
|UFC on ESPN: Chiesa vs. Magny
|
|align=center|2
|align=center|3:39
|Abu Dhabi, United Arab Emirates
|
|-
|Win
|align=center|12–0
|Braian Gonzalez
|Submission (rear-naked choke)
|GFC 20
|
|align=center|1
|align=center|4:34
|Tashkent, Uzbekistan
|
|-
|Win
|align=center|11–0
|Sidemar Honorio
|Decision (unanimous)
|PFL 6
|
|align=center|3
|align=center|5:00
|Atlantic City, New Jersey, United States
|
|-
|Win
|align=center|10–0
|Taras Gryckiv
|Submission (rear-naked choke)
|GFC 14
|
|align=center|1
|align=center|2:46
|Kaspiysk, Russia
|
|-
|Win
|align=center|9–0
|Wagner Lima
|Decision (unanimous)
|Samara MMA Federation: Battle on Volga 10
|
|align=center|3
|align=center|5:00
|Toliatti, Russia
|
|-
|Win
|align=center|8–0
|Saidyokub Kakhramonov
|Decision (unanimous)
|PFL 7
|
|align=center|3
|align=center|5:00
|Atlantic City, New Jersey, United States
|
|-
|Win
|align=center|7–0
|Fatkhidin Sobirov
|Decision (unanimous)
|Samara MMA Federation: Battle on the Volga 4
|
|align=center|3
|align=center|5:00
|Samara, Russia
|
|-
|Win
|align=center|6–0
|Shyudi Yamauchi
|Decision (unanimous)
|Fight Nights Global 83
|
|align=center|3
|align=center|5:00
|Moscow, Russia
|
|-
|Win
|align=center|5–0
|Nauruz Dzamikhov
|Decision (unanimous)
|Fight Nights Global 76
|
|align=center|3
|align=center|5:00
|Krasnodar, Russia
|
|-
|Win
|align=center|4–0
|Valisher Rakhmonov
|Submission (rear-naked choke)
|Fight Nights Global 71
|
|align=center|2
|align=center|4:45
|Moscow, Russia
|
|-
|Win
|align=center|3–0
|Alym Isabaev
|TKO (punches)
|Fight Nights Global 62
|
|align=center|2
|align=center|3:32
|Moscow, Russia
|
|-
|Win
|align=center|2–0
|Ulukbek Amanbaev
|Submission (rear-naked choke)
|Fight Stars: Battle on Sura 6
|
|align=center|1
|align=center|4:12
|Penza, Russia
|
|-
|Win
|align=center|1–0
|Rishat Kharisov
|Submission (guillotine choke)
|Fight Nights Global 57
|
|align=center|2
|align=center|3:28
|Moscow, Russia
|
|-

See also 
 List of current UFC fighters
 List of male mixed martial artists
 List of undefeated mixed martial artists

References

External links 
 
 

1996 births
Nurmagomedov family
Dagestani mixed martial artists
Bantamweight mixed martial artists
Mixed martial artists utilizing sambo
Mixed martial artists utilizing Muay Thai
Ultimate Fighting Championship male fighters
Living people
People from Kizilyurt
Russian male mixed martial artists
Russian Muay Thai practitioners
Russian sambo practitioners